The Marchers is a 2013 French comedy-drama film by Nabil Ben Yadir. It is loosely based on the events surrounding the 1983 March for Equality and Against Racism.

The film's release in November 2013 coincided with the 30th anniversary of the march.

Plot
In 1983 France, teenaged Mohamed is shot by a policeman, but survives. Rejecting his friends' proposal of violent retribution, he proposes political action inspired by Martin Luther King Jr. and Mahatma Gandhi. With two friends, and support from Dubois, the priest of Minguettes, they embark on a non-violent March for Equality and Against Racism from Marseille to Paris.

Cast
Tewfik Jallab as Mohamed
Vincent Rottiers as Sylvain
M'Barek Belkouk as Farid
Nader Boussandel as Yazid
Lubna Azabal as Kheira
Hafsia Herzi as Monia
Olivier Gourmet as Dubois
Charlotte Le Bon as Claire
Philippe Nahon as René Ledu
Jamel Debbouze as Hassan
Malik Zidi as Philippe, the RG
Simon Abkarian as Farid's father
Corinne Masiero as Dominique
Rufus as François, pastor
Benjamin Lavernhe as Thomas
Kévin Azaïs as Rémi 
Françoise Miquelis as Georgina Dufoix
Finnegan Oldfield as Radio Host

Comparison to historical events
But at the start in Marseilles, there was a group of 32, and we obviously could not make a movie with 32 characters. We thus created 10 characters around which we built short stories."

Release
The Marchers had theatrical showings in North America as part of the Rendez-vous with French Cinema series 2014 program.

Reception
Boyd van Hoeij of The Hollywood Reporter said "[t]he film’s message of equality is loud and sincere but Yadir, here directing his second feature, struggles to maintain a workable entente between the downbeat story [...] with misplaced-feeling broad humor."

Peter Debruge of Variety called it "uplifting story of racial tolerance [which] should travel well."

Le Parisien gave it a positive review.

Accolades

References

External links
 
 
 
 La marche at Allocine
  (with English subtitles)

2013 films
2010s political comedy-drama films
French comedy-drama films
2010s French-language films
2010s Arabic-language films
Films about racism
Drama films based on actual events
Political films based on actual events
Films set in Paris
Films set in France
Films set in the 1980s
Films shot in France
Anti-racism in France
Films about activists
Films scored by Stephen Warbeck
2013 comedy films
2013 drama films
2013 multilingual films
French multilingual films
Belgian multilingual films
2010s French films